USS Herzog (DE-178) was a  in service with the United States Navy from 1943 to 1944. She was transferred to Brazil on 1 August 1944 and served as Beberibe (D-19) until 1966. She was scrapped in 1968.

History
Herzog was named in honor of William Ralph Herzog who was posthumously awarded the Navy and Marine Corps Medal for his heroism in trying to save his shipmates in 1942. The ship was launched by Federal Shipbuilding & Drydock Co., Newark, New Jersey, on 5 September 1943; sponsored by Mrs. Alice A. Herzog, mother of the namesake; and commissioned on 6 October 1943.

U.S. Navy (1943-1944) 
 
After conducting shakedown operations out of Bermuda, Herzog steamed from New York on 29 November 1943 on her first escort mission, accompanying  to the West Indies and back to New York. Arriving on 18 December, she got underway as part of the escort for a merchant convoy. Protecting the ships through the dangerous Caribbean passages, Herzog arrived at the Panama Canal Zone on 27 December. Subsequently, she served as escort ship on shorter voyages between Recife, Brazil, and Trinidad.
 
From 14 April until 14 July 1944 Herzog served with Task Group 41.6 on patrol in the South Atlantic. Working with escort carrier  she searched the seas in the never-ending battle against German submarines. On 15 June she was detached to pick up survivors from a German submarine sunk by aircraft, and after returning to the group steamed to Recife, arriving on 23 June. After another brief cruise with the Task Group, she returned to Recife on 16 July.

Brazilian Navy (1944-1968)
She sailed to the Brazilian Naval Base at Natal, Brazil, on 28 July and was placed out of commission and loaned to the Brazilian Navy under lend-lease on 1 August 1944. The ship served Brazil as Beberibe (D-19) and on 30 June 1953 was transferred outright to that country under the Mutual Defense Assistance Program. The ship ran aground in February 1966, and was stricken and scrapped in 1968.

References

External links

 NGB – Contratorpedeiro de Escolta USS Herzog – DE 178 

Cannon-class destroyer escorts of the United States Navy
Ships built in Kearny, New Jersey
1943 ships
World War II frigates and destroyer escorts of the United States
Bertioga-class destroyer escorts
Cannon-class destroyer escorts of the Brazilian Navy
World War II frigates of Brazil
Maritime incidents in 1966
Maritime incidents in Brazil